The Exciting Lloyd Price is the 1959 debut album by American singer Lloyd Price.

Recording and release
Price had recorded several singles going back to 1952 with the hit "Lawdy Miss Clawdy", included on this album.

The success of single "Stagger Lee" lead to Price being one of the biggest-selling music acts of 1959.

The editorial staff of AllMusic Guide gave the release three out of five stars and Billboard awarded it four out of five stars, citing several of the tracks as standout, including "Stagger Lee".

Track listing
"Stagger Lee" (Archibald, Harold Logan, Lloyd Price)– 2:20
"I Wish Your Picture Was You" (Joe E. Brown, Price)– 2:04
"Talking About Love" (Logan, Price)– 2:06
"What Do You Do to My Heart?" (Logan, Price)– 2:37
"You Need Love" (Logan, Price)– 2:48
"Mailman Blues" (Price)– 2:10
"Where Were You (On Our Wedding Day)?" (Logan, John Patton, Price)– 2:37
"Why" (Price)– 2:00
"Lawdy Miss Clawdy" (Price)– 2:35
"Oh, Oh, Oh" (Price)– 2:05
"A Foggy Day" (George Gershwin, Ira Gershwin)– 2:54
"Just Because" (Price)– 2:42

Personnel
Lloyd Price– vocals

Additional musicians
Ted Curson– trumpet
Clarence Johnson– bass guitar
Charles McClendon– tenor saxophone
John Patton– piano
Eddie Saunders– tenor saxophone
Sticks Simpkins– drums

Musicians on "Lawdy Miss Clawdy"
Dave Bartholomew– trumpet and band leader
Fats Domino– piano
Frank Fields– double bass
Joseph Harris– tenor saxophone
Ernest McLean– guitar
Earl Palmer– drums

Technical personnel
Don Costa– production
Natt Hale– liner notes
Matthew Schutz– design
Allen Vogel– photography

References

External links

The Exciting Lloyd Price at Rate Your Music

1959 debut albums
Lloyd Price albums
Albums produced by Don Costa
ABC Records albums